Algeria (ALG) competed at the 1997 Mediterranean Games in Bari, Italy.

Medal summary

Medal table

References

International Mediterranean Games Committee

Nations at the 1997 Mediterranean Games
1997
Mediterranean Games